Clinton 'Clint' Haines (10 April 1976 – 10 April 1997 in St Lucia, Queensland, Australia) was an Australian computer hacker. He was also known as Harry McBungus, TaLoN and Terminator-Z.

Haines attended Ipswich Grammar School. He wrote his first computer virus in assembly language using the A86 assembler in the early 1990s.

Haines was responsible for the viruses NoFrills, Dudley, X-Fungus/PuKE, Daemaen and 1984. NoFrills infected the Australian Tax Office (ATO). It was described by anti-virus company manager Len Grooves as "totally unimpressive". Grooves added: "This is a very average virus...It could have been written by any first-year computer student. In fact, it had serious design faults and programming bugs. I would not hire the writer." Nevertheless, the ATO decided to turn off all of its 15,000 computers until the virus was eradicated, to avoid the infection spreading.

His virus Dudley also infected the computers of Telstra (then called Telecom Australia), shutting down their system in two hours. The Dudley virus was a variant of the No Frills code with the text [Oi Dudley!][PuKE].

Haines died from a heroin overdose in 1997, in St Lucia, Brisbane, celebrating his 21st birthday. At the time of his death he was completing an undergraduate science degree in microbiology at the University of Queensland. A computer virus was written in his honour (RIP Terminator-Z by VLAD). The virus, named 'Memorial', pays acknowledgement to Haines by placing a message on an infected user's screen.

References

1976 births
1997 deaths
Deaths by heroin overdose in Australia
Hackers